Julia Zorn (born 6 February 1990) is a German ice hockey forward and former goaltender for ESC Planegg and the German national team.

She participated at the 2015 IIHF Women's World Championship.

Zorn made history in 2012, becoming the first ever player to compete as a goalie and as a skater at IIHF events. She was a goaltender with the Germany women's national under-18 ice hockey team, but then switched to being a forward, which she has been at subsequent international events.

International career
Zorn was selected for the Germany women's national ice hockey team in the 2014 Winter Olympics. She played in all five games, scoring one goal.

Zorn also played for Germany in the qualifying event for the 2014 Winter Olympics. She also appeared in the 2010 qualifying, as the reserve goaltender.

As of 2014, Zorn has also appeared for Germany at four IIHF Women's World Championships. Her first appearance came in 2009.

Zorn made one appearance for the Germany women's national under-18 ice hockey team, at the IIHF World Women's U18 Championships, in 2008.

Career statistics
Through 2013–14 season

References

External links

1990 births
People from Munich (district)
Sportspeople from Upper Bavaria
Living people
Olympic ice hockey players of Germany
Ice hockey players at the 2014 Winter Olympics
German women's ice hockey forwards